Quinn Gillespie & Associates (QGA) was an American lobbying and communications firm founded in 2000 by Republican political strategist Ed Gillespie and Democratic operative Jack Quinn.  It was sold in 2004 to WPP, one of the world's largest communications services groups, and ceased operations in December 2017.

Staff
Management
Jack Quinn, co-founder and chairman, former counsel to President Bill Clinton and former chief of staff to Vice President Al Gore
Ed Gillespie, former RNC Chairman, White House Communications Director and candidate for senator and governor in Virginia. 
John David "Dave" Hoppe, president, former chief of staff to then-Senate Majority Leader, U.S. Senator Trent Lott (R-MS)
John Feehery, former spokesman for Speaker of the House Dennis Hastert, Rep. Tom Delay and Rep. Bob Michel, and former SVP of communications and public policy at the MPAA
Jim Manley, senior director, Communications and Government Affairs

Democrats
Michael Hussey, Served as chief of staff and chief federal lobbyist for the American Resort Development Association
Bonnie Hogue Duffy, former legislative assistant to Senator Jack Reed (D-RI) and Senior Health Policy Advisor to the Senate Democratic Policy Committee
Ambassador Ralph R. Johnson (ret.)
Kevin Kayes, former chief counsel to Senate Majority Leader Harry Reid (D-NV)
Nick Maduros, worked as an attorney in Arnold & Porter's Public Policy Practice Group
Manuel Ortiz, national finance vice chairman and co-chair of the Hispanic Steering Committee for Senator John Kerry's presidential campaign 
Rick Shapiro, Formerly executive vice president of public affairs for CEMEX's U.S. operations
Stephanie Sutton, Served as New York finance director for then-Congresswoman Kirsten Gillibrand (NY-20)
Patrick Von Bargen, former chief of staff to Senator Jeff Bingaman (D-NM) and managing executive for policy and staff for Chairman William H. Donaldson (R-NY) at the Securities & Exchange Commission

Republicans
Drew Cole
Elizabeth Hogan, previously worked for the Bush Administration and the Republican National Committee
Marc Lampkin, previously served in a variety of roles with the Bush for President campaign and was formerly the general counsel to then-House Republican Conference chairman John Boehner (later House Majority Leader)
David R. Lugar, former director of Congressional affairs for the U.S. Chamber of Commerce
Harriet James Melvin, Previously served as vice president for federal government affairs for Circuit City Stores and CarMax

Communications
Susan Garman Kranias, former managing director and member of the public affairs leadership team at Burson-Marsteller
Virginia Hume, former managing director at BMSG Worldwide
Pat McMurray, worked as a writer-producer on a political talk show at MSNBC, a news editor and writer at The NewsHour with Jim Lehrer, and a news writer at CNN's Washington bureau
Matthew Dornic, Vice President at CNN
Christopher Brown, former journalist and producer of FOX's America's Most Wanted
Ashley Prime, previously worked for the Republican National Committee

Events
QGA's annual Flak Bash honors D.C.'s most daring and verbally agile communicators.

References

External links
 Quinn Gillespie Web Site
 Lobbying Spending - Quinn, Gillespie & Assoc Overview at OpenSecrets.org
 2008 interview with Jack Quinn

Lobbying firms based in Washington, D.C.